Gargano (local dialect of ) is a historical and geographical sub-region in the province of Foggia, Apulia, southeast Italy, consisting of a wide isolated mountain massif made of highland and several peaks and forming the backbone of the Gargano Promontory projecting into the Adriatic Sea, the "spur" on the Italian "boot". In this region since 1978 a feud has been fought between the clans of the Società foggiana.

The Gargano peninsula is partly covered by the remains of an ancient forest, Foresta Umbra, the only remaining part in Italy of the ancient oak and beech forest that once covered much of Central Europe as well as the Apennine deciduous montane forests ecoregion. The Latin poet Horace spoke of the oaks of Garganus in Ode II, ix.

Tourism

The coast of Gargano houses numerous beaches and tourist facilities, including resorts such as Vieste, Peschici and Mattinata. The two major salt lakes of Lesina and Varano are located in the northern part of the peninsula. Gargano is the site of the oldest shrine in Western Europe dedicated to the archangel Michael, Monte Sant'Angelo sul Gargano.

Other tourist attractions include San Giovanni Rotondo, the Abbey of Santa Maria of Ripalta (Lesina) and the volcanic rocks, dating back to the Triassic Period, known as "Black Stones" in Lesina, as well as the Sanctuary of San Nazario.

Annual events
St Primiano and the saint sailing-race on 15 May 
St Nazario and the pilgrimage to the Sanctuary with the same name on July 28
St Rocco's Day on 15, 16 and 17 August in Rignano Garganico
Procession of the Fracchie on Good Friday in San Marco in Lamis
Saint Valentine's day in Vico del Gargano
Pilgrimages (cumpagnie) to the shrine of San Michele Arcangelo in Monte Sant'Angelo on May 8 and September 29
Gargano Running Week is held in October, the first time in 2014 and includes trail running, skyrunning, jogging, ultra distance running and speed running. The 10 K and the half marathon are supervised by FIDAL.

Gargano Peninsula fossils
Some 12 to 4 million years ago, during the Late Miocene to Early Pliocene, a highly endemic vertebrate fauna evolved on what was then Gargano Island due to higher sea levels than today. Several of these animals were subject to island gigantism.

The fossils are found in partially infilled paleokarst fissures across Monte Gargano. The Gargano Island fauna is known as Mikrotia fauna after an endemic rodent genus of the area. Initially named Microtia, this had to be corrected, because the genus name Microtia was already used for butterflies.

The surface features of the ancient karst developed in Mesozoic limestone. In these, sediment accumulated together with the remains of the local fauna, forming thick layers of reddish, massive or crudely stratified silty-sandy clays, known as terrae rossae ("red soils"). Through the mid-Pliocene, some of these deposits were flooded, probably due to tectonic movement of the Apulian Plate. Others were overlaid by other sediments of terrestrial or freshwater origin. In this way a buried, partially reworked paleokarst originated.

Later, as the ice ages cycle got underway, sea levels sank and the former island was continentalized. In the cool and semiarid conditions of the Early Pleistocene (some 1.8–0.8 mya) a second karstic cycle occurred, producing the neokarst which removed part of the paleokarst fill.

Fauna
The Gargano Island endemic mammals included:
 Deinogalerix - 5 species of gymnures ("hairy hedgehogs"), among them the giant D. koenigswaldi with a skull of c.20 cm length. (Freudenthal, 1972; Butler, 1980)
 Hoplitomeryx - some 5 species of "prongdeer" with five horns and sabre-like upper canine teeth. They ranged from tiny to the size of a red deer, and large and small ones apparently occurred at the same time rather than one evolving from the other. (Leinders 1984, van der Geer 2005, van der Geer 2008)
 Mikrotia - 3 or more species of murine rodent. The largest species, M. magna, had a skull 10 cm long. (Freudenthal, 1976, Parra et al., 1999)
 Paralutra garganensis - an endemic species of otter. (Willemsen, 1983)
 Prolagus imperialis and P. apricenicus - huge endemic pika species- P. imperialis was larger than any other known Prolagus.(Mazza, 1987)
 Stertomys - 5 species of dormouse, among them the giant S. laticrestatus (Daams and Freudenthal, 1985) and four smaller species (Freudenthal and Martín-Suárez, 2006)
 Hattomys - 3 species of giant hamsters, among them the giant H. gargantua. (Freudenthal, 1985)

Non-endemic mammals found on the island included:
 Apodemus gorafensis - a field mouse
 A prehistoric species of Cricetus hamster (Freudenthal, 1985)
 Megacricetodon - another hamster (Freudenthal, 1985)

Bird species occurring at Gargano included (studied by Ballmann, 1973, 1976):
 Apus wetmorei, a swift.
 Columba omnisanctorum - one of the oldest pigeon fossils known. It probably was more widespread and if so, the older name C. pisana would likely apply to it.
 Garganoaetus freudenthali and Garganoaetus murivorus - two species of falconid, the former larger than a golden eagle, the latter well-sized; endemic. The smaller species, which likely is the stratigraphically oldest, is closely related to Aquila delphinensis from La Grive-Saint-Alban, France, according to Peter Ballmann in 1973. Its closest living relatives are the small eagles (Hieraaetus, Spizaetus, Lophaetus).
 Garganornis ballmanni, an extinct flightless giant goose-like waterfowl
 "Strix" perpasta - a true owl, perhaps the same as the widespread Bubo zeylonensis lamarmorae, a paleosubspecies of the brown fish-owl (Mlíkovský 2002) but this taxon was usually known from later times.
 Tyto - 2 or 3 species of barn-owls. The largest, T. gigantea, was up to twice as massive as the living eagle-owl Bubo bubo. T. robusta was also large; this species and the former were endemic but actually seem to have been chronosubspecies. The supposed remains of the smaller T. sanctialbani found at Gargano are now placed in the widespread Tyto balearica.
 an indeterminate woodpecker.

Languages
According to Pellegrini, Gargano is home to area IIIb of Southern Italo-Romance varieties. Each town, in turn, speaks its own sub-variety. The Candeloro (or Candelaro in Italian) river defines the boundaries of the promontory as well as the borders with area IIb (that of Foggiano varieties).

See also
Daunia
Tavoliere delle Puglie
Apulia
Garganica, the local breed of goat
Trabucco a giant fishing machine belonging to Gargano tradition
1627 Gargano earthquake

References

Sources
 Butler, M., 1980. The giant erinaceid insectivore, Deinogalerix Freudenthal, from the upper Miocene of Gargano, Italy. Scripta Geologica 57, 1-72.
 Daams, R., Freudenthal, M. (1985): "Stertomys laticrestatus, a new glirid (dormice, Rodentia) from the insular fauna of Gargano (Prov. of Foggia, Italy)." Scripta Geologica 77: 21–27.  (includes full text PDF)
 Freudenthal, M. (1972): "Deinogalerix koenigswaldi nov. gen., nov. spec., a giant insectivore from the Neogene of Italy." Scripta Geologica 14: 1-19 (includes full text PDF)
 Freudenthal, M. (1976): "Rodent stratigraphy of some Miocene fissure fillings in Gargano (prov. Foggia, Italy)". Scripta Geologica 37: 1-23  (includes full text PDF) 
 Freudenthal, M. (1985) "Cricetidae (Rodentia) from the Neogene of Gargano (Prov. of Foggia, Italy)". Scripta Geologica 77: 29-76.  (includes full text PDF)
 Freudenthal, M., Martín-Suárez, E. (2006): "Gliridae (Rodentia, Mammalia) from the Late Miocene Fissure Filling Biancone 1 (Gargano, Province of Foggia, Italy)." Palaeontologia Electronica 9.2.6A: 1-23.
 Leinders, J.J.M. (1984): "Hoplitomerycidae fam. nov. (Ruminantia, Mammalia) from Neogene fissure fillings in Gargano (Italy); part 1: The cranial osteology of Hoplitomeryx gen. nov. and a discussion on the classification of pecoran families". Scripta Geologica 70: 1-51, 9 plates.
 
 Mlíkovský, Jirí (2002): Cenozoic Birds of the World, Part 1: Europe: 215. Ninox Press, Prague.  PDF fulltext
 Parra, V.; Loreau, M. & Jaeger, J.-J. (1999): "Incisor size and community structure in rodents: two tests of the role of competition". Acta Oecologica 20(2): 93-101.  (HTML abstract)

 
  (includes full text PDF)

External links

Parco Nazionale del Gargano 
Official Tourism Information
Pictures from the Gargano and Vieste 

Peninsulas of Italy
Geographical, historical and cultural regions of Italy
Mountains of Apulia
Former islands of Italy
Peaks dedicated to Michael (archangel)
Michael (archangel)